Asociația Club Sportiv Poli Timișoara, commonly known as ACS Poli Timișoara, Poli Timișoara or simply ACS Poli, was a Romanian professional football club based in the city of Timișoara, Timiș County.

The team was founded in 2012, the year the old FC Politehnica Timișoara went bankrupt. ACS Recaș was moved to Timișoara and—supported by the City Council of Timișoara and the Timiș County Council—was meant to continue the history of the original entity. It promoted to the top flight in the 2013–14 season, however attendances were modest as the majority of the former fans chose to support ASU Politehnica Timișoara instead. The Polytechnic University of Timișoara ceased the FC Politehnica brand and records for free use to ACS Poli between 2012 and 2021, but then moved them to ASU Politehnica during the latter year. Also in 2021, ACS Poli was excluded from the Liga III championship and dissolved.

ACS Poli Timișoara played in white and purple kits, although it also used variations of black and white during its first years of existence.

History

In the summer of 2012, ACS Recaș, a club just promoted to the Liga II, was moved to Timișoara and renamed ACS Poli Timișoara after the dissolution of FC Politehnica Timișoara. The new club is co-owned by the City Council and the County Council and has the backing of the Politehnica University of Timișoara, all three being active members in the legal entity running the club. However, the ultras supporters rejected the move and decided to support an alternative project in the lower leagues, ASU Politehnica Timişoara.

Valentin Velcea continued as head coach, while the roster consisted mostly of the core ACS Recaș players and several players from FC Politehnica. At its conception, the club, established as an NGO, was primarily financed by the local authorities, as Timișoara mayor Nicolae Robu insisted control should not be forfeited to private investors. After initially playing in black/white/yellow kits, in order to avoid legal complications while the court ruled over the rightful owner following the bankruptcy of FC Politehnica, the club returned to its historic white-purple colors starting with the 2015–2016 season. As of February 2016, ACS Poli Timişoara is the sole and full owner of all the rights pertaining to and deriving from the Politehnica Timișoara brand and records, following a court decision which nullified the original agreement between the founding club and record holders, and Marian Iancu's insolvent club.

From a competitive perspective, the club failed to equal the achievements of the Marian Iancu era. A yo-yo-ing between the first two leagues, reminiscent of the Politehnica's travails in the 1980s, ensued. The situation was amplified by the fact that the financing received from the local authorities was deemed illegal in the summer of 2015, which left the club without its main financial benefactor. The highlight season for the new Poli came about in 2016–2017, when the club started with a 14 points penalty, as it failed to reach a points minimum the previous year and recorded unpaid debts. In spite of this, Poli, under the management of Ionuţ Popa, rallied to reach the relegation play-off in the dying minutes of the season and defeated rivals UTA Arad 5–2 on aggregate. Moreover, the club reached the first national cup final, finishing runner-up in the Cupa Ligii, while also reaching the semi-finals of the Romanian Cup.

The following season was another struggle and Poli suffered a reversal of fortunes as they were relegated by courtesy of a goal scored late in the last matchday. With financial pressures mounting, the club declared insolvency during the 2018–2019 Liga 2 season and struggled to stay competitive, becoming involved in another fight to avoid relegation. In order to mitigate costs, it was also forced to relocate from the Dan Păltinişanu stadium to the Electrica stadium.

The Romanian Football Federation announced ahead of the start of the 2021–22 Liga II championship that the Polytechnic University of Timișoara, the owner of the logo, history and all of Politehnica Timișoara's football records, approves the use of these by SSU Politehnica Timișoara. ACS Poli was also excluded from the third division and went bankrupt in September 2021.

Supporters and Rivalries
Historically, Poli has been the most prominent football club in Timișoara after 1945, playing consistently in either the first or the second tier of Romanian football. Local rivalries with CFR Timișoara and UM Timișoara were relevant until the early 2000s. Afterwards, the former was relegated to a semi-professional status in the lower leagues and the latter was dissolved in 2008.
	
Nationally, there were strong rivalries with UTA Arad and Dinamo București. The matches against UTA were labeled as the West Derby, due to the proximity of Timișoara and Arad. Matches against CFR Cluj, FCSB, and Universitatea Craiova also drew large crowds.

After the club reincarnated as ACS Poli in 2012, the core factions of the ultras movement decided to support an alternate club in the lower leagues, ASU Politehnica Timișoara. ACS Poli struggled to fill the void created by their departure, with smaller fan factions forming to support the club. Although top-bill matches with historic rivals still attract fans to the stadium, attendances have dropped compared to the averages attained in the 2000s.

Stadia
The club's home ground was Electrica stadium, although most of its history it played on Dan Păltinișanu Stadium.

Honours

Leagues 

Liga II
Winners (1): 2014–15 
Runners-up (1): 2012–13

Cups 

Romanian Cup
Winners (0): 
Runners-up (0):
Best finish: Semi-finals: 2016–17 Cupa României

Cupa Ligii
Runners-up (1): 2016–17

Shirt sponsors and manufacturers

Notable former players
The footballers enlisted below have had international cap(s) for their respective countries at junior and/or senior level and/or more than 50 caps for ACS Poli Timișoara.

  Andrei Artean
  Cristian Bărbuț
  Claudiu Belu
  Cosmin Bîrnoi
  Cristian Bocșan
  Cristian Boldea
  Gabriel Cânu
  Valentin Crețu
  Marius Croitoru
  Alexandru Curtean
  Cristian Daminuță
  Cătălin Doman
  Octavian Drăghici
  Róbert Elek
  Dorin Goga
  Pedro Henrique
  Javi Hernández
  Mario Kirev
  Srdjan Luchin
  Sebastian Mailat
  Marko Marović
  Cristian Melinte
  Florin Nanu
  George Neagu
  Alex Nimely
  Ovidiu Petre
  Adrian Poparadu
  Ovidiu Popescu
  Alexandru Popovici
  Răzvan Raț
  Georgi Sarmov
  Cristian Scutaru
  Alin Șeroni
  Eugen Sidorenco
  Cătălin Straton
  Bogdan Străuț
  Szabolcs Székely
  Igor Țîgîrlaș
  Răzvan Trandu
  Ianis Zicu

Notable former managers

  Dan Alexa
  Silviu Bălace
  Florin Marin
  Ionuț Popa
  Aurel Șunda
  Valentin Velcea

Players

Appearances
Competitive, professional matches only. Only pertains to 2012 onwards.
As of 1 March 2019

Goalscorers 

Competitive, professional matches only. Appearances, including substitutes, appear in brackets. Only pertains to 2012 onwards.
As of 1 March 2019

League history

References

External links
 Official website
 
 Club profile on UEFA's official website

Defunct football clubs in Romania
Football clubs in Timiș County
Sport in Timișoara
University and college association football clubs in Romania
Association football clubs established in 2012
Association football clubs disestablished in 2021
Liga I clubs
Liga II clubs
Liga III clubs
2012 establishments in Romania
2021 disestablishments in Romania